The 2020 IMSA SportsCar Weekend was a sports car race sanctioned by the International Motor Sports Association (IMSA). The race was held at Road America in Elkhart Lake, Wisconsin on August 2nd, 2020. This race was the fourth round of the 2020 WeatherTech SportsCar Championship, and the third round of the 2020 WeatherTech Sprint Cup.

After a 21-minute weather-induced red flag sandwiched between 22 minutes of full-course caution, the race was won by the #7 team of Hélio Castroneves and Ricky Taylor, while the LMP2 class victory was taken by the DragonSpeed entry of Henrik Hedman and Ben Hanley. The GTLM class was won by Antonio García and Jordan Taylor of Corvette Racing, the team's third consecutive victory. AIM Vasser Sullivan also claimed their third consecutive victory, as Frankie Montecalvo and Townsend Bell scored their first class victory of the season.

Background
The race was the third for the series after returning from the COVID-19 pandemic, and the first besides the Rolex 24 which was included on the series' initial pre-pandemic schedule. Fans were allowed to be present at the event, but the garage area was restricted to essential team personnel, when it's typically open to fans. The Mazda duo of Jonathan Bomarito and Harry Tincknell entered the race as defending champions. 

On July 24, 2020, IMSA released the latest technical bulletin, highlighting the BoP for the race. In DPi, the Acura ARX-05 and Mazda RT24-P received weight reductions, while the Cadillac DPi-V.R and Mazda also received reductions in fuel capacity. The Acura also received a boost increase. In GTLM, the BMW M8 GTE received a slight weight decrease and a horsepower increase, while all cars received a fuel capacity increase. The BMW also received a slight boost increase. In GTD, all cars received a fuel capacity increase, and the Ferrari saw a boost decrease. The Audi and Lamborghini saw minor horsepower increases, while the Ferrari and Lexus received almost equivalent decreases. The restrictor diameter on the Lexus was also reduced, while it was increased on the Audi and Lamborghini.

Entries

A total of 31 cars took part in the event, split across four classes. 8 were entered in DPi, 4 in LMP2, 6 in GTLM, and 13 in GTD. In DPi, the only change from the previous event was the return of Chris Miller to the JDC-Miller Motorsports #85 after being replaced by Stephen Simpson at Sebring. Simon Trummer returned in the LMP2 class after being forced to miss the previous round due to travel restrictions. The #8 Tower Motorsport by Starworks car withdrew late in the buildup to the event. GTD saw the largest difference from the previous round, as Meyer Shank Racing returned with their two entries after skipping the Sebring round. Heart of Racing Team also returned for the first time since the season-opening race. GEAR Racing, who had previously announced their intentions to enter the event, were not on the final entry list.

Qualifying
Ricky Taylor claimed overall pole for the event for Acura Team Penske. Patrick Kelly started first in LMP2, while Laurens Vanthoor scored pole in GTLM. Aaron Telitz took pole position in GTD.

Qualifying results

Results

References

External links

IMSA SportsCar Weekend
IMSA SportsCar Weekend
IMSA SportsCar Weekend